Valentyn Vladyslavovych Buhlak (1 January 1963 – 18 July 1996) is a retired Soviet football player and Ukrainian coach. He spent most of his career to Desna Chernihiv the main club in Chernihiv.

Career
In 1981 he started his career Desna Chernihiv until 1983. In 1984 he moved to Metalurh Zaporizhya, where he played 24 matches. In 1984 he moved to Desna Chernihiv for few games and the n he moved to CSKA Moscowl for one season and in 1988  he returned to Desna Chernihiv, where he played 158 games. In 1992 he moved to Tekstylschyk Chernihiv, where he played 18 matches and scored 1 goal.

Honours
FC Cheksyl Chernihiv
Chernihiv Oblast Football Cup 1984

Desna Chernihiv
 Championship of the Ukrainian SSR: Runner-up 1982

References

External links
Profile on website 

1963 births
1996 deaths
Footballers from Chernihiv
Soviet footballers
FC Desna Chernihiv players
FC Metalurh Zaporizhzhia players
FC Cheksyl Chernihiv players
PFC CSKA Moscow players
Ukrainian Premier League managers
Association footballers not categorized by position